Mallin is a village and a former municipality  in the Mecklenburgische Seenplatte district, in Mecklenburg-Vorpommern, Germany. Since 1 January 2012, it is part of the town Penzlin.

References

Former municipalities in Mecklenburg-Western Pomerania